The Pardo River (Portuguese, Rio Pardo) is a river of southern São Paulo state in southeastern Brazil. It is a tributary of the Paranapanema River.

See also
 List of rivers of São Paulo
 List of tributaries of the Río de la Plata

References

Brazilian Ministry of Transport

Rivers of São Paulo (state)